Unknown Gospel may refer to:

 Egerton Gospel
 Gospel of the Saviour, also known as the Unknown Berlin Gospel